Cabramatta railway station is located on the Main South line, serving the Sydney suburb of Cabramatta. It is served by Sydney Trains T2 Inner West & Leppington, T3 Bankstown and T5 Cumberland line services.

History
Cabramatta station opened in 1870 on the Granville to Liverpool section of the Main South line. On 8 October 1924, Cabramatta line became a junction station when another branch of the Main South line opened from Sefton, joining the existing line just north of the station.

In April 1996, the junction was upgraded from a low speed one with an  speed limit. Longer points were installed.

As part of the Southern Sydney Freight Line project, a third line was built behind the eastern side of the station. Due to limited space, an overhead concourse was constructed to replace a building on platform 2. The new concourse opened in 2011, the line in December 2013.

Platforms & services

Transport links
Transdev NSW operates one route to and from Cabramatta station:
S1: to Lansvale (Monday to Friday only)

Transit Systems operate five routes to and from Cabramatta station:
805: to Liverpool station
807: to Cecil Park
815: to Mount Pritchard
816: to Greenfield Park
817: to Fairfield station

Cabramatta station is served by one NightRide route:
N50: Liverpool station to Town Hall station

References

External links

Cabramatta station details Transport for New South Wales
Cabramatta Station Public Transport Map Transport for NSW

Easy Access railway stations in Sydney
Railway stations in Sydney
Railway stations in Australia opened in 1870
Cabramatta, New South Wales
Main Southern railway line, New South Wales